Alexander Biggar may refer to:

Alexander Biggar (1781–1838) of the Biggar family, prominent South African colonists
Alexander Biggar (footballer), Scottish professional footballer